Wilfried Sätty (born Wilfried Podriech; April 12, 1939 – January 31, 1982) was a German graphic artist best known for his black and white collage art.

Biography 
Born in Bremen, Germany, Sätty lived through multiple Allied bombings of Germany during World War II. Sätty moved to San Francisco in 1965 where he got a job at Bay Area Rapid Transit as a draftsman. He died in 1982 from "a fall from a ladder while inebriated." Sätty's final work was published in 2007 by the recipient of his estate, architect and art historian Walter Medeiros, as Visions of Frisco: an Imaginative Depiction of San Francisco during the Gold Rush & the Barbary Coast Era.

He released two collage volumes, The Cosmic Bicycle (1971) and Time Zone (1973), as well as a number of other collections. His works have been exhibited at the San Francisco Museum of Modern Art, the Museum of Modern Art, the Museum of Fine Arts, Boston, and the National Museum, Warsaw.

References 

20th-century German artists
Hippies
Beat Generation people
1939 births
1982 deaths
Artists from Bremen
Artists from San Francisco
German emigrants to the United States